Jesse Joseph Quin (born 3 September 1981) is an English multi-instrumentalist, singer, songwriter and producer best known as the bass player of the alternative rock band Keane. Jesse also founded and runs an arts centre on an abandoned U.S. Air Force base in the English countryside called Old Jet.

Biography
Jesse Joseph Quin was born on 3 September 1981 in Bedford, England. His mother, Charity Quin, is a folk singer; his father, Rob Quin, was a sound engineer. Jesse has a sister named Amber.
Quin began his musical life at an early age. The first instrument he learned to play was the drums. He officially began his musical career in 2007 by forming Jesse Quin & The Mets, with himself on vocals, guitar, and keyboards; plus bassist Jarrett, keyboardist James Barne, guitarist John-William Scott, and drummer King Louis. They released an EP titled Always Catching Up.

Later in 2007 he joined Keane on tour as a roadie. Quin performed with Keane at a concert for Warchild in 2007. He played bass on Keane's cover of "Under Pressure". Quin was invited by Keane to help record their album Perfect Symmetry and then toured with them on the Perfect Symmetry World Tour. He recorded with Keane on Night Train and eventually became an official member of the band (which was announced on their official website on 3 February 2011).

Personal life
Quin married longtime girlfriend Julia Dannenberg in 2009.

Discography

With Keane

Studio albums
Perfect Symmetry (2008)
Strangeland (2012)
Cause and Effect (2019)

EPs
Retrospective EP1 (2008)
Night Train (2010)
Retrospective EP2 (2010)
Compilations album
The Best of Keane (2013)

With Mt. Desolation
Studio albums
Mt. Desolation (2010)
When the Night Calls (2018)

References

External links
 Old Jet website
 Keane official website

1981 births
Living people
English male guitarists
Male bass guitarists
English composers
Keane (band) members
People from Bedford
21st-century English bass guitarists
Mt. Desolation members